Cyanothamnus montimulliganensis is a plant in the citrus family Rutaceae and is endemic to a single mountain in Queensland. It is an erect, woody shrub with pinnate or bipinnate leaves and  white, four-petalled flowers usually arranged singly in leaf axils.

Description
The branches are slightly hairy but covered with pimply glands. The side leaflets are similar to the end leaflet but longer. The eight stamens are hairy.

Taxonomy and naming
This species was first formally described in 2003 by Marco F. Duretto who gave it the name Boronia montimulliganensis in the journal  Muelleria. The specific epithet (montimulliganensis) refers to the isolated Mount Mulligan, the only place where this species is known to occur. In a 2013 paper in the journal Taxon, Marco Duretto and others changed the name to Cyanothamnus montimulliganensis on the basis of cladistic analysis.

Distribution and habitat
Cyanothamnus montimulliganensis grows in woodland on sandstone on Mount Mulligan in north Queensland.

Conservation
Cyanothamnus montimulliganensis (as Boronia montimulliganensis) is listed as of "least concern" under the Queensland Government Nature Conservation Act 1992.

References 

montimulliganensis
Flora of Queensland
Plants described in 2003
Taxa named by Marco Duretto